
A brush is a device with bristles, wire or other filaments used for cleaning, grooming, painting, etc.

Brush may also refer to:

Brushes

Grooming and cleaning
Hairbrush, a brush designed for grooming hair
Toothbrush, a brush designed for cleaning teeth
Toilet brush, a brush used to clean toilets

Applying substances
Paintbrush, a brush used to apply paint or ink
Ink brush, a brush used in East Asia for calligraphy
Pastry brush, also known as a basting brush, a cooking utensil used to spread oil or glaze on food
Airbrush, by analogy, a tool for spraying paint

Other
Brush (electric), a component which conducts current between stationary wires and moving parts
Drum brush, a type of drumstick in music

Places
Brush, Colorado, a statutory city located in eastern Morgan County, Colorado, United States
Brush Creek (disambiguation), the name of many streams, particularly in the United States
Brush Hill (disambiguation)
Brush Lake (disambiguation)
Brush Valley (disambiguation)

Plants
Underbrush, plants that live below the forest canopy
Prunings, cuttings from small trees and shrubs
Indian Paintbrush (disambiguation), a name that may refer to butterfly weed, hawkweed or the genus Castilleja
Scrubland, a plant community characterized by scrub vegetation, sometimes referred to as the brush

Manufacturing
Brush Development Company, former manufacturer of audio and phonographic equipment
Brush Engineered Materials, a metal manufacturing company
Brush Motor Car Company, a defunct United States automobile company
Brush Traction, a United Kingdom locomotive manufacturer
Brush Turbogenerators, a multi-national holding company for companies that build generators, owned by Melrose plc
Brush Electrical Machines, a United Kingdom generator manufacturer
Brush HMA, a Dutch generator manufacturer
Brush SEM, a Czech generator manufacturer

Other uses
 Brush (Martian crater)
 Brush (surname)
 Brush (video game), a building-block for video game levels
 , a United States Navy destroyer
 Basil Brush, a fictional fox on British television
 Ben Brush (1893-1918), American racehorse and sire

See also
 Brushing (disambiguation)
 Scrub brush (disambiguation)